Gracie Madigan Abrams (born September 7, 1999) is an American singer-songwriter. Her debut EP, Minor, was released in July 2020 through Interscope Records. Her second EP, This Is What It Feels Like, was released in November 2021, with singles "Feels Like" and "Rockland". Her debut album, Good Riddance was released on February 24, 2023.

Early life and education 
Born and raised in Los Angeles County, California, Abrams is the daughter of J. J. Abrams, a film director, and Katie McGrath, a film and television producer. She has two brothers, an older brother Henry and younger brother August. She became interested in music at a young age. She attended The Archer School for Girls. After graduating high school in 2018, Abrams studied international relations at Barnard College but took a break after her freshman year to focus on music. Her father's family is Jewish, while her mother's background is Irish Catholic.

Career 
In October 2019, Abrams released her debut single, "Mean It", under Interscope Records.

On July 14, 2020, Abrams released her debut EP, Minor. The EP was supported by several singles, including "I miss you, I'm sorry" and "21". She colaborated with producers such as Joel Little and Blake Slatkin.

On March 24, 2021, Abrams released a new single with Benny Blanco titled "Unlearn". The single is part of Blanco's album Friends Keep Secrets 2. On May 7, 2021, Abrams released the single "Mess It Up" along with its music video. 

In October 2021, Abrams released the single "Feels Like" and its music video. It was followed by her release of a new song titled "Rockland", which was created with Aaron Dessner. The next month, Abrams announced her second commercial project This Is What It Feels Like. It was released as an EP on November 12, 2021. The project includes the preceding singles "Feels Like" and "Rockland". In support of this EP, she embarked on the This Is What It Feels Like Tour, which started on February 2, 2022, in Salt Lake City and concluded on May 31, 2022, in Stockholm. Along with her headlining tour, Abrams opened for Olivia Rodrigo as the supporting act for her Sour Tour, where she performed songs of her latest project. 

"Block Me Out" and "Difficult" were released in April and October of the same year respectively, with the latter being the lead single to her debut album.

On January 9, 2023, Abrams announced her debut album, Good Riddance, which was released on February 24, 2023. The second single, titled "Where Do We Go Now?", was released on January 13. The third single, "Amelie", was released on February 10.

Abrams will be an opening act on selected shows of the US leg of Taylor Swift's upcoming The Eras Tour. She will also embark on the Good Riddance Tour, her third headlining concert tour. Special guest Tiny Habits will open for Abrams on her US tour. 

Gracie Abrams also appeared on Jimmy Kimmel Live performing "I know it wont work like that" on February 24, the same night her Album released.

Artistry and reception 
Abrams has cited Joni Mitchell, Simon & Garfunkel, Elvis Costello, Bon Iver, Elliott Smith, Kate Bush, The 1975, James Blake, Taylor Swift, Lorde, Metric, The Killers, and Phoebe Bridgers as her musical influences.

Swift, Bridgers, Lorde, Post Malone, Billie Eilish, and Olivia Rodrigo each expressed their admiration for Abrams.

Activism 
After a leaked draft opinion showed that the U.S. Supreme Court was planning to overturn abortion rights established in Roe v. Wade, Abrams was among 160 musical artists including Clairo, Lorde, Olivia Rodrigo, and Phoebe Bridgers that signed a full-page ad in The New York Times in May 2022 condemning the planned Supreme Court decision. In July 2022, Abrams released a limited-edition t-shirt whose complete sale proceeds would go to the National Network of Abortion Funds. While this is "only a small part in a massively anti-democratic effort that is underway in this country" Abrams admits, she believes that she can "use my platform to amplify the experts in this moment".

In a 2020 interview, Abrams supported expressing personal views through music, saying, "I can't separate my music from my opinions... it's a whole that reflects my way of thinking. You shouldn't be afraid to talk about what you believe in."

Discography

Studio albums

Extended plays

Singles

As lead artist

As featured artist

Promotional singles

Tours 
Headlining
 I've missed you, I'm sorry Tour (2021)
 This Is What It Feels Like Tour (2022)
 Good Riddance Tour (2023)
Supporting
 Olivia Rodrigo – Sour Tour (2022)
 Taylor Swift – The Eras Tour (2023)

References

External links 
 
 

1999 births
21st-century American women singers
21st-century American singers
American people of Polish-Jewish descent
J. J. Abrams
Living people
Singer-songwriters from California
Singers from Los Angeles
Barnard College alumni